is a professional Japanese baseball player. He plays infielder for the Tohoku Rakuten Golden Eagles.

References 

1997 births
Living people
Baseball people from Kanagawa Prefecture
Meiji University alumni
Japanese baseball players
Nippon Professional Baseball infielders
Tohoku Rakuten Golden Eagles players